RealD 3D is a digital stereoscopic projection technology made and sold by RealD. It is currently the most widely used technology for watching 3D films in theaters. Worldwide, RealD 3D is installed in more than 26,500 auditoriums by approximately 1,200 exhibitors in 72 countries as of June 2015.

Technology
RealD 3D cinema technology is a polarized 3D system that uses circularly polarized light to produce stereoscopic image projection. The advantage of circular polarization over linear polarization is that viewers are able to tilt their head and look about the theater naturally without seeing double or darkened images. However, as with other systems, any significant head tilt will result in incorrect parallax and prevent the brain from correctly fusing the stereoscopic images.

The high-resolution, digital cinema grade video projector alternately projects right-eye frames and left-eye frames, switching between them 144 times per second. The projector is either a Texas Instruments Digital Light Processing device or Sony's reflective LCOS (liquid crystal on silicon). A push-pull electro-optical liquid crystal modulator called a ZScreen is placed immediately in front of the projector lens to alternately polarize each frame. It circularly polarizes the frames clockwise for the right eye and counter-clockwise for the left eye. The audience wears circularly polarized glasses that have oppositely polarized lenses that ensures each eye sees only its designated frame. In RealD Cinema, each frame is projected three times to reduce flicker, a system called triple flash. The source video is usually produced at 24 frames per second per eye (total 48 frames/s), which may result in subtle ghosting and stuttering on horizontal camera movements. A silver screen is used to maintain the light polarization upon reflection and to reduce reflection loss to counter some of the significant light loss due to polarization filter absorption. The result is a 3D picture that seems to extend behind and in front of the screen itself.

See also

Polarized 3D system
List of 3D films
Digital 3D
IMAX 3D
Disney Blu-ray 3D
Panavision 3D
Dolby 3D
XpanD 3D
MasterImage 3D
Lenny Lipton
4DX

References

Further reading

External links

 
Who is Lenny Lipton? About Inventor and Chief technical officer of RealD through 2008

Motion picture film formats
Film and video technology
3D imaging
3D cinema